Thoreau is a crater on Mercury.  Its name was adopted by the International Astronomical Union (IAU) in 1985. The crater is named for American poet and philosopher Henry David Thoreau.

To the south of Thoreau is Lysippus crater, and to the southeast is Vieira da Silva crater.

References

Impact craters on Mercury